Robert Mihai Ivan (born 24 April 2000) is a Romanian professional footballer who plays as a defender for Dunărea Călărași. He made his debut in Liga I on 2 June 2019, in a match between Gaz Metan Mediaș and Concordia Chiajna, ended with the score of 3–1.

References

External links
 
 Robert Ivan at lpf.ro

2000 births
Living people
Romanian footballers
Association football defenders
Liga I players
Liga II players
Liga III players
CS Concordia Chiajna players
FC Dunărea Călărași players